Gerald William Barrax (June 21, 1933 – December 7, 2019) was an American poet and educator.

His poems appeared in numerous anthologies and journals. He was recognized by several awards, including the Raleigh Medal of Arts for "Extraordinary Achievement in the Arts" in 1993, the Sam Regan Award for contribution to the fine arts in North Carolina in 1991, and the 1983 Callaloo Creative Writing Award for Nonfiction Prose.

Barrax served as a Professor of English and creative writing at North Carolina State University.

Biography 
Barrax was born in Attalla, Alabama, on June 21, 1933. Barrax spent his early years in the rural South before moving with his family to Pittsburgh in 1944. Barrax began to write poetry when he was 18. Barrax earned a bachelor's degree at Duquesne University, and a master's degree in English from the University of Pittsburgh in 1969. After the completion of his master's program, Barrax moved to North Carolina, where he joined the faculty of North Carolina State University in 1970.

In a 2009 documentary produced by the North Carolina Department of Natural and Cultural Resources, Barrax said that he was the first black teacher at North Carolina State University. He retired from teaching in 1997.

In 2009, Barrax was awarded the North Carolina Award for Literature.

Barrax was struck and killed by a vehicle on December 7, 2019, in southeast Raleigh, North Carolina. He was 86 at the time of his death. The driver allegedly did not yield to Barrax in a pedestrian crosswalk, fatally hitting him. Barrax died after he was rushed for treatment to WakeMed Hospital after suffering critical injuries.

Works 
Barrax published these books of poetry:

 1970: Another Kind of Rain,
 1980: An Audience of One : Poems
 1987: The Deaths of Animals and Lesser Gods, Vol. 4
 1992: Leaning against the Sun, nominated for both the Pulitzer prize and the National Book Award.
 1998: From a Person Sitting in Darkness : New and Selected Poems

References

Notes

External links
Barnes&Noble
An Interview with Gerald Barrax
The Southern Cross

1933 births
2019 deaths
North Carolina State University faculty
Poets from Alabama
University of Pittsburgh alumni
People from Etowah County, Alabama
Writers from Pittsburgh
Duquesne University alumni
Road incident deaths in North Carolina
Poets from Pennsylvania
American male poets
20th-century American poets
20th-century American male writers
21st-century American poets
21st-century American male writers
Pedestrian road incident deaths